Goowarra is a rural locality in the Central Highlands Region, Queensland, Australia.

Geography 
The Capricorn Highway passes through the locality from the south-east (Wallaroo) to the south-west (Dingo). The Central Western railway line also passes through the locality to the immediate north of the highway, with the locality being served once being served by the now-abandoned Goowarra railway station.

The predominant land use is grazing on native vegetation.

History 
Bridgewater Provisional School opened on 1900. In 1901 it was renamed Goowarra Provisional School. On 1 January 1909 it became Goowarra State School. It had a number of temporary closures due to low student numbers before closing permanently in 1924.

Mourindilla Provisional School opened on 1921 but closed circa 1924. Mourindilla is a pastoral property in the north of the locality.

Education 
There are no schools in Goowarra. The nearest primary school is Dingo State School in neighbouring Dingo to the west. The nearest secondary school is Blackwater State High School in Blackwater to the west.

References 

Central Highlands Region
Localities in Queensland